Hargrave House may refer to:

Hargrave House (Hazlehurst, Mississippi), listed on the National Register of Historic Places in Copiah County, Mississippi
Hargrave House (Statesville, North Carolina), listed on the National Register of Historic Places in Iredell County, North Carolina